DXD can refer to:

 Destruction By Definition, ska-core band The Suicide Machines' first album. 
 Digital by Digital, a section of the Cinequest Film Festival's competition
 Digital eXtreme Definition, a professional audio format
 Disney Xtreme Digital, a community web site by Disney, similar to MySpace
 Disney XD, the Disney channel that replaced Toon Disney.
 High School DxD, a Japanese light novel series written by Ichiei Ishibumi.